was a Japanese prosecutor and Head of Civil Affairs Bureau (1918–1922) and 1st Governor (1922–1923) of the South Seas Mandate. He was from Miyazaki Prefecture. He was a graduate of the University of Tokyo.

Biography
He was born in Takanabe Town, Koyu District, Miyazaki Prefecture . In 1901 (Meiji 34), he graduated from Tokyo Imperial University Law School and became an assistant judicial officer. In 1903 (Meiji 36), he became a public prosecutor and served at the Hakodate Ward Court, the Hakodate District Court , the Sapporo District Court , and the Numazu Ward Court. In 1908 (Meiji 41), he was transferred to the Ministry of Home Affairs, and successively served as Fukui Prefectural Clerk and Police Chief , Nagasaki Prefectural Clerk and Police Chief , and Shimane Prefectural Home Affairs Director.

In 1918 ( Taisho 7), he was appointed Chief of Naval Affairs and Chief of the Temporary Civil Affairs Department of the Defense Force of the South Sea Islands , and took charge of the administration of the South Sea Islands .

In 1922 (Taisho 11), when the Temporary South Seas Archipelago Defense Corps was abolished and the Nan'yō Government was established, he was appointed as the first director.

References

1873 births
1933 deaths
Governors of the South Seas Mandate
Japanese Home Ministry government officials
Japanese prosecutors
University of Tokyo alumni
People from Miyazaki Prefecture